Darius Grigalionis (born April 21, 1977 in Panevėžys) is a backstroke swimmer from Lithuania, who competed in three consecutive Summer Olympics for his native country, starting in 1996. He was born in the city of Panevėžys. A student of the Kaunas University of Technology, he had been a scholarship holder with the Olympic Solidarity Program since August 2002.

References
 

1977 births
Living people
Lithuanian male backstroke swimmers
Olympic swimmers of Lithuania
Swimmers at the 1996 Summer Olympics
Swimmers at the 2000 Summer Olympics
Swimmers at the 2004 Summer Olympics
Sportspeople from Panevėžys
Kaunas University of Technology alumni
European Aquatics Championships medalists in swimming